The SAM Coupé is a British 8-bit home computer manufactured by Miles Gordon Technology (MGT) and released in 1989. Games released for the computer include the following.

External links
Games Database: MGT Sam Coupe
Retro Gamer: SAM Coupé
SAM.Speccy.cz/games
The List of Sam Coupé Games
World of SAM

References 

Video game lists by platform